Dowlatabad (also Romanized as Dowlatābād; also known as Daulatābād and Dowlatābād Ḩūmeh) is a village in Golshan Rural District, in the Central District of Tabas County, South Khorasan Province, Iran. At the 2006 census, its population was 56, in 14 families.

References 

Populated places in Tabas County